Chase is an American crime drama television series that aired on the NBC network from September 11, 1973, to April 10, 1974. The show was a production of Jack Webb's Mark VII Limited for Universal Television and marked the first show created by Stephen J. Cannell, who later became known for creating and/or producing his own programs, including NBC's The A-Team. Jack Webb directed the pilot, which aired March 24, 1973.

Overview
The show's title had a double meaning: it was at once the first name of the lead character, Chase Reddick (Mitchell Ryan), the leader of a special team of the Los Angeles Police Department that specialized in solving unusually difficult or violent cases, and indicative of the show's emphasis on the determined pursuit and undercover surveillance of hardened criminals. The unit, headquartered in an old firehouse, relied mainly on alternate/undercover means of transportation such as helicopters, motorcycles, custom vans, taxis, four-wheel-drive vehicles, sports and muscle cars, work trucks (vehicles from the Public Works Department, the telephone company, tow trucks and/or the Postal Service and civilian delivery services) and high-speed driving to apprehend its suspects.

For the first fourteen episodes, Reddick, an LAPD captain, was accompanied by K-9 Sergeant Sam MacCray (Wayne Maunder) and three young officers: Steve Baker (Michael Richardson), Norm Hamilton (Reid Smith), and Fred Sing (Brian Fong). In January 1974, Webb and Universal dropped all the regulars except Ryan and Maunder in favor of a new group of officers: Frank Dawson (Albert Reed), Ed Rice (Gary Crosby, who frequently appeared on the other Mark VII shows), and Tom Wilson (Craig Gardner).  Never seen, but "appearing" in every episode was actual LAPD dispatcher Shaaron Claridge, who had worked on Dragnet and Adam-12; according to the pilot script, she was assigned especially to Chase.

NBC first scheduled the show on Tuesdays at 8 p.m. Eastern, opposite CBS' hit series Maude and Hawaii Five-O. At about the same time as the casting change, the network moved Chase to Wednesday nights at 8 p.m. against the Sonny and Cher Comedy Hour. Despite the declining appeal and ratings of the latter (and the couple's forthcoming divorce), Chase did no better there and ended after a one-season run. Cannell would re-use the format of a team of specialists in The A-Team, co-created with Frank Lupo a decade later. Robert A. Cinader, who also supervised Mark VII's Adam-12 and Emergency!, was executive producer of Chase.

Cast
 Mitchell Ryan . . . Capt. Chase Reddick
 Craig Gardner . . . Tom Wilson
 Brian Fong . . . Off. Fred Sing (episodes 1–14)
 Wayne Maunder . . . Sgt. Sam MacCray
 Albert Reed . . . Frank Dawson
 Gary Crosby . . . Ed Rice
 Reid Smith . . . Off. Norm Hamilton (episodes 1–14)
 Shaaron Claridge
 Michael Richardson . . . Off. Steve Baker (episodes 1–14)

Episodes

Sources
 Total Television: A Comprehensive Guide to Programming from 1948 to the Present, Alex McNeil, New York: Penguin, revised ed., 1984.

External links
 
 

NBC original programming
1970s American drama television series
1973 American television series debuts
1974 American television series endings
Fictional portrayals of the Los Angeles Police Department
Television series by Mark VII Limited
Television series by Universal Television
English-language television shows
American detective television series
Television series created by Stephen J. Cannell